St. Joseph Community Consolidated School District 169 is a public school district in Champaign County, Illinois, United States. It serves the village of St. Joseph, and the surrounding rural areas.

Schools 
There are two schools in the district:
St. Joseph Grade School (Pre K-4)
St. Joseph Middle School (5-8)

References

External links 
 https://www.stjoe.k12.il.us/

Education in Champaign County, Illinois
School districts in Illinois